Molot-Prikamye Perm is a professional ice hockey team based in Perm, Perm Krai, Russia. They are playing in the Supreme Hockey League, the second level of ice hockey in Russia.

References

External links
Molot-Prikamye Perm official website 

Ice hockey teams in Russia
Ice hockey clubs established in 1948
Sports clubs in Perm, Russia